The Misleading Lady is a 1920 American silent comedy film. Co-directed by George Irving and George W. Terwilliger, the film stars Bert Lytell, Lucy Cotton, and Frank Currier. It was released on December 20, 1920.

Cast

References

1920 films
American silent feature films
American black-and-white films
Silent American comedy films
1920 comedy films
1920s English-language films
Films directed by George Irving
1920s American films